Daniel Joseph Lauria (born April 12, 1947) is an American actor, known for playing the role of Jack Arnold in The Wonder Years (1988–1993), Jack Sullivan on Sullivan and Son (2012–2014), and Al Luongo on Pitch (2016–2017).

Early life
Lauria, an Italian-American, was born in Brooklyn, New York, the son of Carmela (née Luongo) and Joseph J. Lauria. He also lived in Lindenhurst, New York. He graduated from Lindenhurst Senior High School in 1965 as a varsity football player, and he briefly taught physical education at Lindenhurst High School. A Vietnam War veteran, Lauria served as an officer in the United States Marine Corps; he served at the same point in his life that Jack Arnold, his character in The Wonder Years, did during the Korean War. In Vietnam, he served as a platoon commander at An Loc near the Cambodian border. He got his start in acting while attending Southern Connecticut State University in New Haven, Connecticut, on a football scholarship.

Career
Lauria is best known for his portrayal of Jack Arnold, the money-conscious father on the TV series The Wonder Years, that ran from 1988 to 1993. He also played NASA Administrator James Webb in the 1998 TV miniseries From the Earth to the Moon and Commanding Officer, USA in 1996's Independence Day.  More recently he has appeared as Police Commissioner Eustace Dolan in The Spirit. He appeared as Coach Hamstrung in The Three Stooges N.Y.U.K. on AMC in 2000. Lauria appeared on stage in New York in the summer of 2006 in an Off Broadway production of A Stone Carver by William Mastrosimone with Jim Iorio and Elizabeth Rossa. Lauria also had a small role in a season two episode of Army Wives, as well as a season one episode of The Mentalist. In 2009, Lauria has appeared as General Lee Whitworth, M.D. in Criminal Minds season 4. He has also appeared in an episode of Boy Meets World, starring Ben Savage, the younger brother of Fred Savage. In late 2009, Lauria returned to the Off Broadway stage, appearing as Jimmy Hoffa in Brian Lee Franklin's Good Bobby, a fictionalized account of Robert F. Kennedy's rise.

In 2010, Lauria appeared as Vince Lombardi in the Broadway play Lombardi. The play received positive reviews, with sportswriter Jim Hague commenting, "Lauria truly becomes Vince Lombardi. You almost forget you're watching an actor. He's Lombardi through and through, down to the wire-framed glasses and intimidating scowl." North Bergen football coach Vince Ascolese, who met Lombardi, commented "I really felt like he was Lombardi. It was uncanny." Lauria's portrayal of Lombardi was used during the NFL on FOX introduction to Super Bowl XLV, where one of the two participating teams was the Green Bay Packers; the team Lombardi coached to victories in the first two Super Bowls in 1967 and 1968. The Packers went on to defeat the Pittsburgh Steelers in that game.

In 2012, Lauria played the part of Jean Shepherd in the Broadway production of A Christmas Story: The Musical, a role which he reprised off Broadway at Madison Square Garden in 2013. From 2012 through 2014, he played Jack Sullivan on the Steve Byrne sitcom Sullivan & Son.

Lauria served one year as a Department of Veterans Affairs celebrity hospital visitor, during which he toured many VA hospitals, meeting patients.

Filmography

Film

 1981 C.O.D. as Secret Service Man #2
 1983 Without a Trace as Baker
 1985 South Bronx Heroes as FBI Agent
 1987 Stakeout as Detective Phil Coldshank
 1993 Another Stakeout as Captain Phil Coldshank
 1995 Excessive Force II: Force on Force as Orlando Franco
 1996 Faithful
 1996 No One Could Protect Her as Detective Greg Coming
 1996 Independence Day as Commanding Officer
 1998 True Friends as Pauley
 1998 Wide Awake as Father Peters
 1999 Stranger in My House as Dennis
 1999 A Wake in Providence as Rudy
 2001 Full Disclosure as Clive Carter
 2001 Ricochet River as Coach Garth
 2002 Contagion as General Ryker
 2002 Outside the Law as Detective Froman
 2002 High Times Potluck as Carmine
 2002 The Empath
 2003 Dead Canaries as Vito Scaldafieri
 2005 The Signs of the Cross as Mr. Coyne
 2005 Jesus, Mary and Joey as Father Gino
 2006 Big Momma's House 2 as Crawford
 2008 Dear Me as Mr. Hunt
 2008 The Spirit as Commissioner Eustace Dolan
 2009 Alien Trespass as Chief Dawson
 2009 Donna On Demand as Detective Lewis
 2009 Dead Air as Fred
 2009 InSearchOf as Reverend Blackwell
 2010 The Waiter as Father Parks
 2011 Here's the Kicker as Dave Berry
 2011 Life of Lemon as Arthur
 2013 Make Your Move as Parole Officer Foster
 2014 Sister as Jeffrey Presser
 2017 The Concessionaires Must Die! as Jack Fisk
 2017 An American Dog Story as Paw Poochini
 2017 Locating Silver Lake as Speaker
 2020 The Eagle and the Albatross as Dr. Al Wiserman
 2020 The Way Back as Gerry Norris
 2020 Holidate as Wally

Television

 1982 Muggable Mary, Street Cop (TV movie) as Vince Palucci
 1985–1987 Scarecrow and Mrs. King as Foster / Rogan
 1986 Doing Life (TV movie) (with Tony Danza)
 1986 Growing Pains as Hockey Coach Brockton
 1986–1987 Growing Pains as Dan / Hockey Coach
 1987 L.A. Law as Joseph Sears
 1987 Wiseguy as Detective Jack Philips
 1987–1988 Cagney & Lacey as Detective Harry Dupnick
 1988 David (TV movie) as John
 1988–1993 The Wonder Years as Jack Arnold
 1990 The Big One: The Great Los Angeles Earthquake (TV movie) as Steve Winslow
 1993 In the Line of Duty: Ambush in Waco (TV movie) as Bob Blanchard
 1995 Amazing Grace as Harry Kramer
 1996 Terror in the Family (TV movie) as Todd Marten
 1996–1997 Party of Five as Coach Russ Petrocelli
 1997 Boy Meets World as Judge Lamb
 1997 Prison of Secrets (TV movie) as Sergeant Ed Crang
 1997 Walker, Texas Ranger as Salvatore Matacio
 1997 Dr. Quinn Medicine Woman as Major Samuel Mortison
 1998 From the Earth to the Moon (TV miniseries) as James Webb
 1999 Batman Beyond as Bill Wallace (voice)
 2000 Static Shock as Sean Foley (voice)
 2000 Diagnosis Murder as Donald Purdy
 2000 N.Y.U.K. as Coach Hamstrung
 2001 Smallville as Coach Walt Arnold
 2003 JAG as Allen Blaisdell
 2003 Law and Order: Special Victims Unit as Peter Kurtz
 2005 Ghost Whisperer as Ellis Conway
 2007 Psych as Bill Peterson
 2007 The Bronx Is Burning (TV miniseries) as Detective Borelli
 2007 The Black Donnellys as Franny Kenny
 2008 How I Met Your Mother as Nolan
 2009 Criminal Minds as General Lee Whitworth
 2010 Law & Order: Criminal Intent as Boxing Gym Owner
 2011 Nurse Jackie as Carl
 2011 Law & Order: Special Victims Unit as Ray Masters
 2011 Harry's Law as Judge Raymond Gillot
 2012 NCIS: Los Angeles as James Cleary
 2012 Sullivan & Son as Jack Sullivan
 2012 Person of Interest as Stanley Amis
 2012–2014 Perception as Joe Moretti
 2014 Hot in Cleveland as J.J.
 2015–2019 Blue Bloods as FDNY Commissioner Stan Rourke
 2016 Pitch as Al Luongo
 2017 The Night Shift as Doug
 2017 Elementary as Louis Garmendia
 2017 NCIS as Morgan Cade
 2018 Man with a Plan as Frank
 2018 Shameless as Mo White
 2018 This Is Us as Toby's Father
 2019 The Resident as Simon Ortiz
 2020 MacGyver as Next Door Neighbor
 2021 The Goldbergs as Mr. Wofsy (Next Door Neighbor)

See also

References

External links

1947 births
Living people
Male actors from New York City
American male film actors
United States Marine Corps personnel of the Vietnam War
American male television actors
American people of Italian descent
United States Marine Corps officers
20th-century American male actors
21st-century American male actors
People from Brooklyn
People from Lindenhurst, New York